Five Science Fiction Novels is a 1952 anthology of five science fiction novellas edited by Martin Greenberg.  The stories originally appeared in the magazines Unknown and Astounding SF.

Contents

 But Without Horns, by Norvell W. Page
 Destiny Times Three, by Fritz Leiber
 Crisis in Utopia, by Norman L. Knight
 The Chronicler, by A. E. van Vogt
 The Crucible of Power, by Jack Williamson

Reception
The New York Times reviewer Basil Davenport reported the anthology contained "three hits, one near miss, and one bad miss,"  declaring it "almost always at least entertaining, and at its best provocative." Davenport faulted "The Crucible of Power" as "no more than a short story," and found "Crisis in Utopia," although attractively imaged, to be weakly plotted. Of the "hits," he described "But Without Horns" as a familiar tale "told with real suspense; reported "The Chronicler" to be a typical van Vogt story where action kept the reader's interest even when the ideas became murky; and praised "Destiny Times Three" as the book's high point.

References

Sources

1952 anthologies
Science fiction anthologies
Books with cover art by Frank Kelly Freas
Gnome Press books